Disney Channel is a British-managed Polish pay television kids' channel, owned and operated by The Walt Disney Company Limited in London.

It was launched on 2 December 2006, on Canal+ Premium, Polsat Box, Orange TV and some local cable providers. Within the launch, Disney Channel marks 2nd popular in Poland, next to MiniMini+.

It previously broadcast 16 hours a day from 6:00am to 10:00 pm (UTC+01:00), and began at 24 hours since 9 May 2010. It became a non-commercial channel since December 2, 2010, separating the EMEA feed. Disney Channel have won three times in Telekamery's Tele Tydzień in the "Children's Channel" category.

History

Pre-launch 
Before the channel launch, Disney Co. Ltd. made a block-time agreement to the television station TVP1, to air in their programming block "Walt Disney Przedstawia", began back on 5 January 1991, appearing twice a week especially on Saturdays.

In many years, the programming block changed its schedule and time. It was first show at 2:30 pm until August 1994, then is scheduled earlier from 1:00 to 1:30 pm since September 1994. At 12:10 pm from March 1998, at 10:20 am from September 1998, at 10:00 am from July 1999, and at 9:30 to 9:35 am in September 1999.

It was also appeared on Sundays during "Wieczorynka", until it was ended on 1 January 2005.

Post-launch 
The Disney Channel began on 2 December 2006 at 5:00pm (UTC+01:00) which shares the promo feeds from the Scandinavia and Middle Eastern version, and was firstly aired was the 2004 movie The Incredibles. The rating went up during the launch, and have an estimated 315,000 views.

On 23 July 2010, Disney Co. Ltd. released Disney na Żądanie (transl.: Disney On Demand), a video on demand service which is exclusively for UPC Digital subscribers in the country.

On 1 August 2010, Disney Channel was separated from Disney Channel EMEA.

On Summer 2013, Disney Channel Poland launched in widescreen.

On 1 October 2015, Disney Channel launched its HD channel.

On 23 April 2022, Disney Channel began broadcasting with a Polish sign language (PJM) in the series Miraculous: Tales of Ladybug & Cat Noir on weekends, especially of some viewers who have hearing impairments. Which is featuring Alicja Szurkiewicz from Fundacji Kultury bez Barier as she's responsible for the translation of the sign language.

As of 1 April 2022, it still broadcasts Disney XD, along with the Dutch and Canadian versions. Which most countries shut down for their business changes since 2020. As well as Disney Junior in the said country, and Disney shows will also be seen via Disney+ follows the launch in the country, along with Eastern Europe on 14 June 2022.

Related services

Disney na Żądanie (Disney On Demand) 
Disney na Żądanie (transl.: Disney On Demand) is a video on demand service that was launched back on 23 July 2010, exclusively to UPC digital TV subscribers.

Website (disneychannel.pl) 
disneychannel.pl was the official website of the Disney Channel in the country. This website has been converted into a free application since 2017.

Disney Junior (formerly Playhouse Disney) 

 
Disney Junior is Polish preschool television channel targeted to kids until 12 years old. It was launched on 3 December 2006 as a morning launched on Disney Channel, which is a day after the said channel was launched. It was later launched as a television channel back on 1 September 2010. It was later rebranded to Disney Junior on both the channel and morning block on 1 June 2011 at 6:00 am. (UTC+01:00)

Disney XD 

Disney XD is a sister television channel of, targeting for kids and teens 6–14 years old. It was launched on 19 September 2009, replacing Jetix. It broadcasts both its own productions, series thematically addressed to the target group, as well as series and movies known from Disney Channel.

As of 2022, the Polish along with the Dutch versions of Disney XD were the remaining channels in Europe, and outside North America.

Programming blocks on TVP1 
Prior to the launch of Disney Channel on 2 December 2006, Disney program were firstly aired in TVP1 began on 5 January 1991. Thought these program blocks which were used until 2014:

 Walt Disney Przedstawia (Walt Disney Presents) (5 January 1991 – 1 January 2005; 2013–2014) - Disney animated series, and early seen films.
 Disneya! Cudowny Świat (Disney! Wonderful World) (30 November 2008 – 2012) - full and short movies mostly from Pixar.
 Walt Disney w Jedynce (Walt Disney on Jedynka) (12 September 2009-April 2012) - Disney's animated series and sitcoms.

Availability 
Disney Channel is available in these providers below.

 Platforma Canal+ - Channel 97
 Multimedia Polska - Channel 104
 Polsat Box - Channel 86 (SD), 172 (HD)
 UPC Polska - Channel 609

Logos

References

External links
 Official website
 Disney Channel Poland Schedule
 Disney Channel Poland on YouTube

Poland
Television channels and stations established in 2006
Television channels in Poland
Children's television networks
2006 establishments in Poland